Sparisoma rocha is a species of parrotfish endemic to the islands of Trindade and Martin Vaz in southeastern Brazil. The species can be distinguished from its congeners  easily by its coloration. S. rocha is a herbivore, grazing on algae that grows on rocks or coralline substrate.

Etymology
It was named after Luiz A. Rocha to honor his contributions to ichthyology.

References 

Fish of Brazil
Taxa named by Hudson T. Pinheiro
Taxa named by João Luiz Rosetti Gasparini
Fish described in 2010
Sparisoma